Zwingenberg may refer to the following places in Germany:

 Zwingenberg (Baden)
 Zwingenberg, Hesse
 Zwingenberg Castle, Baden-Württemberg